Cateristis eustyla is a species of moth in the family Tineidae. This species is found in New Zealand and Tasmania. It is classified as "Data Deficient" by the Department of Conservation.

Taxonomy 
C. eustyla was described by Edward Meyrick in 1889 using specimen he found at Riccarton Bush in December. In 1928 George Hudson discussed the species. The lectotype specimen is held at the Natural History Museum, London.

Description 
Meyrick described the species as follows:

Distribution 
This species is found in New Zealand. It is also found in Tasmania. This species has not been recorded in New Zealand since 1882.

Habitat 
This species frequents forest habitat.

Conservation Status  
This species has been classified as having the "Data Deficient" conservation status under the New Zealand Threat Classification System.

References

Moths described in 1889
Lyonetiidae
Moths of New Zealand
Taxa named by Edward Meyrick
Moths of Australia